Dee Dee Bridgewater is the eponymous second studio album by American jazz singer Dee Dee Bridgewater. The record was released in 1976 via Atlantic Records label. She also released a self-titled album in 1980 via the Elektra label.

Critical reception
Reviewer of Dusty Groove noted "The sound here is different than the material Bridgewater started with, but still plenty great from a soul perspective – tightly-crafted, sophisticated work that features both uptempo and mellow cuts – in a mode that's quite similar to the Columbia work of Marlena Shaw – another former jazz vocalist who made a 70s shift to soul."

Stacia Proefrock of Allmusic wrote "Dee Dee Bridgewater's self-titled album opens with a song that sounds closer to Gloria Gaynor than Ella Fitzgerald, throwing her jazz fans for a loop. This 1976 release explores R&B and funk territories, while still employing her strong, husky voice. She shows the amazing range and emotional expression that would make her "comeback" albums of the '90s so remarkable, while apparently having a lot of fun. While this album is out of character for her stylistically, it is still a fine addition to any fan's collection."

Track listing

Personnel

Band
Dee Dee Bridgewater – primary artist, vocals
Barry Beckett – keyboards
Harry Bluestone – concertmaster
Herb Bushler – bass
Pete Carr – guitar
Vivian Cherry – backing vocals 
Merry Clayton – backing vocals 
Gary Coleman – percussion
Henry Davis – bass
Wilton Felder – bass
Jerry Friedman – guitar
Jim Gilstrap – backing vocals 
Ed Greene – drums
Loni Groves – backing vocals 
Bobbye Hall  – congas
Roger Hawkins – drums

Tom Hensley – keyboards
David Hood – bass
Augie Johnson – backing vocals 
Jimmy Johnson – guitar
John Lehman – backing vocals 
Marti McCall – backing vocals 
Cliff Morris – guitar
Linda November – backing vocals 
Ray Parker Jr. – guitar
Dean Parks – guitar
Melvin Ragin – guitar
Joe Sample – keyboards
David T. Walker – guitar
Jackie Ward – backing vocals 
Carolyn Willia – backing vocals 
Harold Wheeler – horn arrangements, keyboards, string arrangements
Gene Orloff – concertmaster

Production
Bob Defrin – art direction
Lewis Hahn – mixing
Gregg Hamm – engineer
David Hassinger – engineer
Jerry Masters – engineer
Steve Melton – engineer
Billy Page – vocal arrangement
Gene Page – arranger, producer
Stephen Y. Scheaffer – mixing, producer
Paula Scher – art direction
Jon Vogel – mastering
Jerry Wexler –producer

References

External links 

Dee Dee Bridgewater albums
1976 albums
Albums arranged by Gene Page
Albums produced by Jerry Wexler
Atlantic Records albums